The Daily News (TDN) is the primary newspaper of Longview and Kelso, Washington, and Cowlitz County, Washington. Lee Enterprises acquired the newspaper in 2002, with its purchase of Howard Publications. Howard, in turn, had purchased the paper in 1999 from Ted Natt and John Natt, grandsons of John M. McClelland Sr., ending 76 years of McClelland-Natt family ownership. According to "R.A. Long's Planned City" by John McClelland Jr., McClelland Sr. purchased the paper, which began as a Long-Bell Lumber Company daily, from Robert A. Long, the lumber magnate and founder of Longview. Long founded both Longview and The Daily News in 1923.

Pulitzer Prize
When nearby Mount St. Helens showed signs of instability in 1980 and subsequently erupted, The Daily News scrambled to cover the crisis. The paper's staff won the 1981 Pulitzer Prize for Local, General, or Spot Reporting, as well as the 1981 national Sigma Delta Chi Award. The Pulitzer committee specifically mentioned the photography of Roger A. Werth. A book written by the newspaper staff on the eruption became a New York Times bestseller. Following the death of the paper's publisher in a helicopter crash, the Associated Press established the regional Ted Natt Award for First Amendment journalism.

References

External links 
 
 Coverage of Mount St. Helens eruption
 History of The Daily News, from Lee Enterprises
 Roger Werth Oral History Interview

1923 establishments in Washington (state)
Daily newspapers published in the United States
Lee Enterprises publications
Longview, Washington
Newspapers published in Washington (state)
Publications established in 1923
Pulitzer Prize-winning newspapers